The Black Hussar may refer to:

The Black Hussar (1932 film), a 1932 German historical drama film
The Black Hussar (1915 film), a 1915 German silent film